Robert Hicks, better known as Barbecue Bob (September 11, 1902 – October 21, 1931), was an early American Piedmont blues musician. His nickname was derived from his working as a cook in a barbecue restaurant. One of the three extant photographs of him show him playing a guitar and wearing a full-length white apron and cook's hat.

Early life
Hicks was born in Walnut Grove, Georgia. His parents, Charlie and Mary Hicks, were farmers. He and his brother, Charlie Hicks, together with Curley Weaver, were taught how to play the guitar by Curley's mother, Savannah "Dip" Weaver. Bob began playing the 6-string guitar but picked up the 12-string guitar after moving to Atlanta, Georgia, in 1924. He became one of the prominent performers of the newly developing Atlanta blues style.

In Atlanta, Hicks worked at various jobs, playing music on the side. While working at Tidwells' Barbecue in a north Atlanta suburb, he came to the attention of Columbia Records talent scout Dan Hornsby. Hornsby recorded him and used Hicks's job to publicize his records, having Hicks pose in chef's whites and hat for publicity photos and dubbing him "Barbecue Bob". Before his death in 1931, he married a woman named Claudine and lived off Hillard Street in Atlanta.<ref name = "Census"

Career
During his short career Hicks recorded 68 78-rpm sides. His first, "Barbecue Blues", was recorded in March 1927. The record quickly sold 15,000 copies and made him a best-selling artist for Columbia's race series. Following this initial success, his next release firmly established him in the race market. At his second recording session, in New York City in June 1927, he recorded "Mississippi Heavy Water Blues", a song inspired by the Great Mississippi Flood of 1927. This song and his other blues releases were popular, and his records sold better than those of other Atlanta blues musicians.

With his brother Charley Lincoln (also known as Charlie Lincoln or Laughing Charley) he recorded "It Won't Be Long Now", a duet with crosstalk, in Atlanta on November 5, 1927. In April 1928, Hicks recorded two sides with the singer Nellie Florence, whom he had known since childhood, and also produced "Mississippi Low Levee Blues", a sequel to "Mississippi Heavy Water Blues". In April 1930, he recorded "We Sure Got Hard Times Now", which contains bleak references to the Great Depression. Barbecue Bob was primarily a blues musician, but he also recorded a few traditional songs and spirituals, including "When the Saints Go Marching In", "Poor Boy, Long Ways from Home" and "Jesus' Blood Can Make Me Whole".

Barbecue Bob also recorded as a member of the Georgia Cotton Pickers in December 1930, a group consisting of Bob and the guitarist Curley Weaver and harmonica player Buddy Moss. As a group they recorded a handful of sides, including their adaptation of Blind Blake's "Diddie Wa Diddie" (recorded as "Diddle-Da-Diddle") and the Mississippi Sheiks' "Sitting on Top of the World" (recorded as "I'm on My Way Down Home"). They were his last recordings.

Hicks died in Lithonia, Georgia, of a combination of tuberculosis and pneumonia brought on by influenza, at the age of 29, on October 21, 1931. His recording of "Mississippi Heavy Water Blues" was apparently played at his graveside before the burial.

Musical style
Hicks developed a "flailing" or "frailing" style of guitar playing more often associated with the traditional clawhammer banjo (as did his brother, and, initially, Curley Weaver). He regularly used a bottleneck on his 12-string guitar, playing in an elemental style that relied on an open Spanish tuning, reminiscent of Charley Patton. He had a strong voice, which he embellished with growling and falsetto, and a percussive singing style.

Influence
Hicks had some influence on Atlanta blues musicians, such as the young Buddy Moss (who played harmonica with him on recordings by the Georgia Cotton Pickers), but his way of playing was quickly overshadowed by the finger-picked Piedmont blues style, which rose in popularity by the late 1920s and early 30s; this development can be heard in the recordings of Curley Weaver.

Barbecue Bob's "Motherless Child Blues" was recorded and performed on stage by Eric Clapton. John Fahey attributed his arrangement of "Poor Boy a Long Ways from Home" to Barbecue Bob in his 1979 Best Of book of tablature. Fahey attributed the song to the fictitious Blind Joe Death, writing that "Death learned this from an old Columbia record by Barbecue Bob [14246-D], which the Death household at one time possessed."

Hicks's elder brother, Charley Lincoln, also played blues and was recorded by Columbia under the name Laughing Charley Lincoln, but he never received the same acclaim as his brother.

See also
List of blues musicians
List of country blues musicians
List of guitarists
List of nicknames of blues musicians
List of Piedmont blues musicians
Yazoo Records

Recording sessions
Atlanta, March 25, 1927
New York City, June 15, 1927
New York City, June 16, 1927
Atlanta, November 5, 1927
Atlanta, November 9, 1927
Atlanta, November 10, 1927
Atlanta, April 13, 1928
Atlanta, April 21, 1928
Atlanta, October 26, 1928
Atlanta, October 27, 1928
Atlanta, November 2, 1928
Atlanta, April 11, 1929
Atlanta, April 17, 1929
Atlanta, April 18, 1929
Atlanta, October 30, 1929
Atlanta, November 3, 1929
Atlanta, November 6, 1929
Atlanta, April 17, 1930
Atlanta, April 18, 1930
Atlanta, April 23, 1930
Atlanta, December 5, 1930
Atlanta, December 7, 1930
Atlanta, December 8, 1930

References

Swinton, Paul. (2001). The Essential Barbecue Bob. Audio CD liner notes. Classic Blues 200026.
Document Records, vols. 1–3. Sleeve notes on Barbecue Bob (Robert Hicks).

External links

Barbecue Bob page from Blues Online site
Barbecue Bob page from MP3.com site
 Biography on East Coast Piedmont Blues site
Barbecue Bob at AuthenticBlues.com

1902 births
1931 deaths
African-American guitarists
20th-century African-American male singers
Country blues singers
American blues guitarists
American male guitarists
Country blues musicians
People from Walton County, Georgia
Musicians from Atlanta
Columbia Records artists
20th-century American guitarists
Guitarists from Georgia (U.S. state)
20th-century deaths from tuberculosis
Tuberculosis deaths in Georgia (U.S. state)
Deaths from pneumonia in Georgia (U.S. state)
Deaths from influenza